Another Life is a 2001 British crime film written and directed by Philip Goodhew. It stars Ioan Gruffudd, Natasha Little, Nick Moran, Imelda Staunton, Rachael Stirling and Tom Wilkinson.

Plot summary
Chiefly set in London during the First World War and in the early 1920s (primarily 1921 and 1922) and based on a true story, the film concerns a daydreaming young woman, Edith Graydon (Little), who attracts, then marries, an ordinary shipping clerk, Percy Thompson (Moran), who reminds her of a character in books. Later, Edith carries on an affair with Frederick Bywaters (Gruffudd), a young merchant seaman and childhood friend of her younger brother. The Thompsons' marriage had been a failure for years when Edith became reacquainted with Bywaters, who by then was dating Avis (Stirling), Edith's younger sister. Over the course of their tempestuous affair, Edith writes to Bywaters during his extended absences at sea about her growing boredom and frustration with the dull Percy, who has grown jealous and violent at times.

The letters burst with Edith's vivid imagination, including her hopes for a romantic future with Bywaters and her alleged attempts to kill her husband through feeding him glass and poisons. Edith's fantasy-driven promises to leave Percy stir Bywaters to a frenzy; he also resents the way Percy deprecates and even injures Edith. Finally, Bywaters attacks Percy with a knife, as the couple walk home from the theatre. The resulting trial and conviction of the lovers creates a sensation across Britain, as Edith maintains her innocence of any part in her husband's murder. Her letters paint a different picture, despite Bywaters' insistence he acted alone and impulsively. Despite a massive number of signatures on a petition protesting against Edith's death sentence, the lovers hang on the same day. To the end, Edith conjures up dreams of her sentence being commuted to life imprisonment, so her captors must sedate and carry her off to the scaffold.

Cast
Natasha Little as Edith Graydon (later Thompson)
Nick Moran as Percy Thompson
Ioan Gruffudd as Frederick Bywaters
Imelda Staunton as Ethel Graydon
Rachael Stirling as Avis Graydon
Tom Wilkinson as Mr Carlton
Diana Coupland as Mrs Lester
Michael Bertenshaw as William Graydon
Daniel Brocklebank as Newnie
Elizabeth McKechnie as Mrs Thompson
Judy Clifton as Nora Lester
Simon Paris as Sergeant Mew
Alex Potter as Young Billy Graydon
Anton Gregory as Young Harold Graydon
Rikki Doughty as Young Freddy Bywaters
Juliet Forester as Miss Prior
Helen Brampton as Lily Thompson
Daniel Goode as Kenneth
Gyuri Sarossy as Archie
Arthur Gerard as Mr Lester
Jack Cassidy as Older Billy Graydon
Daniel Louw as Older Harold Graydon
Nicholas Hutchison as Dr Maudsley
Alan Leith as Detective Inspector Hall
Michael Sheard as Mr Justice Shearman
Miles Richardson as Clerk of court
Bruce Purchase as Sir Henry Curtis-Bennett
John Tordoff as John Ellis
Richard Mayes as Prison chaplain
Sean Boru as Courtroom photographer (uncredited)
 Mel Oakley as the gentlemen recruit.

External links

2001 films
2000s crime films
British independent films
Crime films based on actual events
Films set in London
Films set in the 1910s
Films set in 1921
Films set in 1922
2000s historical films
British historical films
2000s English-language films
2000s British films